Gibostad is a village on the large island of Senja in Senja Municipality in Troms og Finnmark county, Norway. Many of the buildings in the harbour area are about 200 years old. The soil is very fertile and therefore suitable for farming, which is why  Senja is also home to an agricultural school at Senja High School. The lake Lysvatnet is located just west of the village.

For a long time, Gibostad was the administrative centre of the old municipality of Lenvik, but the administration was moved to Finnsnes during the 1960s, following the growth of that city. Gibostad is the largest village on northern Senja, located about midway between Botnhamn and Finnsnes, where the strait of Gisundet is narrowest. The village of Bjorelvnes and Lenvik Church lie directly across the strait from Gibostad.

References

External links

Villages in Troms
Populated places of Arctic Norway
Senja